Milčice is a village, part of and located about 2.5 km southeast from Myslív in the Klatovy District. There are 66 addresses registered.  In 2011, 98 people lived here permanently. It is also a cadastral territory with an area of 4.28 km2.

History 
The date of the village's foundation is unknown.

Chapel of St. Joseph

Genealogy and Immigration to America 
So far, about 46 people born in Milčice have been identified as immigrating to America, sorted and profiled on FamilySearch.

References

Populated places in Klatovy District